A College preparatory course is a means by which college bound high school students may better meet the more stringent scholastic requirements for entry into colleges and universities.  Students taking college-preparatory courses may have an increased quantity of classwork, and expectations to achieve are at a higher level.  The GPA weight for college-preparatory courses may have more value for college entry programs than regular courses.  College prep courses are particularly appropriate for providing the academic background needed to succeed in a degree program at a college or university.  Above college-preparatory in difficulty is honors, where the advanced structure while similar in many ways to college prep, requires even more effort from the student.  In many schools, a student can move from college-preparatory courses to Advanced Placement courses, if they attain a certain average.

See also
 Education in the United States

References

Secondary education in the United States
School terminology
High school course levels
Curricula